Briggs Reservoir may refer to:
 Briggs Reservoir (Manomet, Massachusetts)
 Briggs Reservoir (Plymouth, Massachusetts)